Guillermo Rodríguez Lara (born 4 November 1924), known as "Bombita", is a former military dictator of Ecuador who was in power from 15 February 1972 to 11 January 1976. He took courses in C&R&Bn Staff, Irregular Warfare Orientation, and Maintenance Management at the School of the Americas in Panama. 

As commander of the army, he led a military coup d'etat executed by a navy commander named Jorge Queirolo G. and forced president José María Velasco into exile, to Buenos Aires, Argentina. During his rule, drilling the country's oil reserves funded the construction of hospitals, schools, roads (notably, paving the Quito-Tulcán road), the oil refinery at Esmeraldas, and new equipment for the armed services. The Ecuadorian military removed him from power in 1976.

References

External links
 Official Website of the Ecuadorian Government about the country President's History

1924 births
Living people
People from Pujilí
Ecuadorian generals
Presidents of Ecuador
Leaders who took power by coup
Leaders ousted by a coup
Ecuadorian expatriates in Panama